is a late-night variety program hosted by comedian Kazuyoshi Morita, better known as Tamori. It is broadcast in Japan on the TV Asahi network. It started on 8 October 1982, and is one of the longest-running programs in Japan. This program deals with social phenomena from original, maniac viewpoints. Due to its "low budget" (not really true, but a running joke on the show), it has no stage sets, and almost all of the shooting is done on location.

Guests
Though this is a midnight program, many celebrities are fond of this program and want opportunities to appear on it. The show's regular feature “Soramimi Hour” where misconstrued song lyrics are set to amusing videos is hosted by Tamori and Hajime Anzai, has also become famous in its own right.

Opening
In a famous opening video, many women with shorts shake their hips along with "Short Shorts" by The Royal Teens. Then the program is introduced by Tamori with his customary speech,  Instead of a single theme overlying the entire series, various topics are addressed in each episode; this “no principle” is one of the program's main attractions. However, most topics that have been picked are subcultural matters such as vehicles (especially railways), sex culture, technologies, foods and so on.

See also
 Tamori
 Soramimi, a term for a type of comedy pioneered by the "Soramimi Hour" segment of Tamori Club

External links
 Official Website

Japanese variety television shows
TV Asahi original programming
1982 Japanese television series debuts
1980s Japanese television series
1990s Japanese television series
2000s Japanese television series
2010s Japanese television series